Thomas Overton was an American military and political leader.

Thomas Overton may also refer to:

Thomas Overton (fl.1397) MP for Northampton (UK Parliament constituency)
Thomas Overton (MP for Sandwich), in 1510, MP for Sandwich (UK Parliament constituency)
 Tom Overton (1930–1988), American sound engineer